Tenaska is a private, independent energy company based in the United States. The employee-owned company was founded in 1987 and is headquartered in Omaha, Nebraska, with regional offices in Dallas, Denver, Philadelphia, Boston, Houston, and Calgary and Vancouver in Canada. The company employs approximately 700 people.

Tenaska is involved in all aspects of power generation, as well as natural gas and electric power marketing.

The company has developed approximately 16,400 megawatts (MW) of natural gas-fueled and renewable power projects (solar, wind and hydroelectric). Tenaska and its affiliates have managed the acquisition of approximately 10,750 MW of energy assets.

Forbes magazine consistently ranks Tenaska among the largest private U.S. companies.

History 
In 1987, energy executives Howard Hawks, Tom Hendricks and a few others launched Tenaska with the idea that success in an evolving energy industry was a job best suited for a small, private company. Their goal was to build one or two power plants; the company has now built a total of 17.

The company later established affiliates to focus on multiple aspects of the energy industry. Tenaska Marketing Ventures (TMV) manages, trades or sells approximately 10 percent of the total natural gas consumption of the United States and Canada. Similarly, Tenaska Power Services Co. (TPS), an affiliate to market power and provide ancillary services, is the leading provider of energy management services to generation and demand-side customers in the U.S.

Scope of Business 
Natural gas marketing: Tenaska Marketing Ventures provides natural gas supply chain management services that include a reliable fuel supply, market and logistical services, asset management and financial and physical hedging services.

Power marketing: Tenaska Power Services Co. provides energy management services to generation and demand-side customers in the U.S. TPS offers optimization, risk management, power trading and settlement services.

Development: Tenaska Development combines the flexibility to capitalize on evolving market needs with the deep expertise that comes with decades of experience developing energy projects throughout the United States. As technologies continue to advance and the market appetite for renewable power continues to grow, Tenaska Development’s focus remains on high-value opportunities. The Tenaska Development portfolio currently includes carbon capture and sequestration, natural gas-fired generation, renewable fuel peakers, wind, solar and battery storage projects.

Generation: Tenaska Generation manages and operates one of the safest and most reliable generating fleets in the United States. Encompassing natural gas, wind and solar, the Tenaska Generation fleet consists of 7,580 megawatts of generation combined.

Community Involvement 
Tenaska has a longstanding record of support for community programs where it does business. Employees are actively involved at all levels of nonprofit service as donors, volunteers, board members and civic leadership and in many other ways. More than $900,000 in scholarships have been awarded in communities where its generating facilities are located. In addition, the Tenaska Corporate Scholarship Program provides academic financial assistance to seniors at public high schools located near our corporate headquarters in Omaha, as well as our Dallas regional office. 

Tenaska hires locally when possible and works with contractors that help fulfill that commitment.

Recognitions 

 No. 53, America's Largest Private Companies – Forbes magazine
 Among top five natural gas marketers in North America (Tenaska Marketing Ventures) – Platts Gas Daily
 No. 1 gas pipeline capacity release trading (Tenaska Marketing Ventures) – Capacity Center
 No. 1 in Value and Customer Satisfaction (Tenaska Marketing Ventures) – MASTIO & Company
 Five Voluntary Protection Program Star Worksites (Tenaska Virginia Generating Station, Tenaska Kiamichi Generating Station, Tenaska Frontier Generating Station, Tenaska Gateway Generating Station, Tenaska Lindsay Hill Generating Station) – Occupational Safety & Health Administration, U.S. Department of Labor

References

Energy companies of the United States